Leipoxais is a genus of moths in the family Lasiocampidae. The genus was erected by William Jacob Holland in 1893.

Species
Based on Afromoths:
Leipoxais acharis Hering, 1928
Leipoxais adoxa Hering, 1928
Leipoxais batesi Bethune-Baker, 1927
Leipoxais compsotes Tams, 1937
Leipoxais directa (Walker, 1865)
Leipoxais dives Aurivillius, 1915
Leipoxais dolichoprygma Tams, 1931
Leipoxais emarginata Aurivillius, 1911
Leipoxais fuscofasciata Aurivillius, 1909
Leipoxais haematidea (Snellen, 1872)
Leipoxais humfreyi Aurivillius, 1915
Leipoxais ituria Bethune-Baker, 1909
Leipoxais lipophemisma Tams, 1929
Leipoxais major Holland, 1893
Leipoxais makomona Strand, 1912
Leipoxais manica Hering, 1928
Leipoxais marginepunctata Holland, 1893
Leipoxais miara Hering, 1928
Leipoxais obscura Aurivillius, 1909
Leipoxais peraffinis Holland, 1893
Leipoxais proboscidea (Guérin-Méneville, 1832)
Leipoxais proboscifera Strand, 1912
Leipoxais regularis Strand, 1912
Leipoxais roxana (Fawcett, 1915)
Leipoxais rufobrunnea Strand, 1912
Leipoxais siccifolia Aurivillius, 1902
Leipoxais strandi Aurivillius, 1927
Leipoxais tamsi Fletcher D. S., 1968
Leipoxais tolmera Tams, 1929

External links

Lasiocampinae
Moth genera